Dhulipalla Veeraiah Chowdary was an Indian politician from Telugu Desam party and former member of Andhra Pradesh Legislative Assembly. He was the Revenue Minister in Government of Andhra Pradesh during N. T. Rama Rao tenure.

He served as MLA from 1983 to 1994 representing Ponnur (Assembly constituency) . He has played a prominent role in growth and success of Sangam Milk Producer Company Limited (Sangam Dairy).

He strived hard to improve the lives of rural milk producing farmers, especially in Guntur District of Andhra Pradesh. He was Popularly known Pala Veeraiah for his association with milk producers. Recognizing his contribution towards the dairy industry, he was given responsibility as Chairman for Andhra Pradesh Diary Development Cooperative Federation (APDDCF), Hyderabad.

References 

Members of the Andhra Pradesh Legislative Assembly
1942 births
1994 deaths